Charles Wirgman (22 July 1875 – 6 June 1953) was a British sports shooter. He competed in the 50 yard free pistol event at the 1908 Summer Olympics.

References

1875 births
1953 deaths
British male sport shooters
Olympic shooters of Great Britain
Shooters at the 1908 Summer Olympics
Sportspeople from High Wycombe